Kenya Power and Lighting Company, commonly referred to as Kenya Power or shortened KPLC, is a public liability company which transmits, distributes and retails electricity to customers throughout Kenya.

Location
KPLC headquarters are at Stima Plaza, Kolobot Road in Parklands, Nairobi. The coordinates of the company headquarters are: 01°16'18.0"S, 36°49'14.0"E (Latitude:-1.271668; Longitude:36.820552).

Overview 
Kenya Power is a public company listed in the Nairobi Securities Exchange (NSE). The company is a national electric utility company, managing electric metering, licensing, billing, emergency electricity service and customer relations.

In addition to electricity distribution to industry, offices, schools, hospitals, and domestic users, KPLC also offers optic fiber connectivity to telecommunication companies through its optical fiber cable network that runs along its high voltage power lines across the country mainly to manage the national power grid.

History
Kenya Power traces its origins to 1875 when Seyyied Barghash, the Sultan of Zanzibar, acquired a generator to light his palace and nearby streets. This generator was acquired in 1908 by Harrali Esmailjee Jeevanjee, a Mombasa-based merchant, leading to the formation of the Mombasa Electric Power and Lighting Company whose mandate was to provide electricity to the island. In the same year, Engineer Clement Hirtzel was granted the exclusive right to supply Nairobi city with electricity. This led to the formation of the Nairobi Power and Lighting Syndicate.

In 1922, the Mombasa Electric Power and Lighting Company and Nairobi Power and Lighting Syndicate merged under a new company known as East African Power and Lighting Company (EAP&L). The EAP&L expanded outside Kenya in 1932 when it acquired a controlling interest in the Tanganyika Electricity Supply Company Limited (now TANESCO) and later obtaining a generating and distribution licenses for Uganda in 1936, thereby entrenching its presence in the East African region. EAP&L exited Uganda in 1948 when the Uganda Electricity Board (UEB) was established to take over distribution of electricity in the country.

On 1 February 1954, Kenya Power Company (KPC) was formed and commissioned to construct the transmission line between Nairobi and Tororo in Uganda This was to transmit power generated at the Owen Falls Dam to Kenya. KPC was managed by EAP&L under a management contract. In the same year, EAP&L listed its shares on the Nairobi Securities Exchange. Making it one of the first companies to list on the bourse.

EAP&L exited Tanzania in 1964 by selling its stake in TANESCO to the Government of Tanzania. Due to its presence in only Kenya, EAP&L was renamed the Kenya Power and Lighting Company Limited (KPLC) in 1983.

Kenya Power Company de-merged from KPLC in 1997 and rebranded to Kenya Electricity Generating Company (KenGen) and in 2008, the electricity transmission infrastructure function was carved out of KPLC and transferred to the newly formed Kenya Electricity Transmission Company (KETRACO). Kenya Power and Lighting Company (KPLC) was re-branded Kenya Power in June 2011.

Shareholding
The 20 largest shareholders in the stock of KPLC, as of 31 August 2015, are illustrated in the table below:

Note:Totals are slightly off due to rounding.

Subsidiary
In 2015, KPLC elevated its wholly owned school, Kenya Power Training School to the Institute of Energy Studies and Research (IESR), to "provide training solutions for the power sector in the areas of generation, transmission, distribution and inter-connectivity". The primary target population are the countries of the Northern Corridor.

Controversy 
The company has been faced with a lot of controversy regarding making of losses, despite having a major source of profit through sale of electricity to the public, as well as charging exceptionally high electricity bills that caused public uproar. As of April 2021, the company had a commercial debt of KSh. 65.5 billion (approx. US$555 million).

Power purchase from Ethiopia
In 2022, Kenya Power Limited signed a 25-year power purchase agreement, whereby Ethiopian Electric Power will sell and Kenya Power will buy electricity at specified agreed rates. For the first three years, 200 MW will be exchanged, with the quantity increasing to 400 MW in the remaining 22 years of the contract. The power will be transmitted along the Sodo–Moyale–Suswa High Voltage Power Line. The contract begins on 1 November 2022.

See also
 Energy in Kenya
 Kenya Electricity Generating Company
 Nairobi Securities Exchange

References

External links
 Website of Kenya Power and Lighting Company Limited
 Website of Institute of Energy Studies & Research
 Kenya Power Contacts

Electric power companies of Kenya
Companies based in Nairobi
Energy companies established in 1922
1922 establishments in Kenya
Companies listed on the Nairobi Securities Exchange